The 2004 WNBA season was the fifth season for the Seattle Storm. They captured their first title in franchise history, bringing a title back to Seattle for the first time since 1979 when the Seattle SuperSonics, the Storm's former sister team, brought a title to Seattle by beating the Washington Bullets.

Offseason

WNBA Draft

Regular season

Season standings

Season Schedule

Playoff Results

Player stats
Note: GP= Games played; REB= Rebounds; AST= Assists; STL = Steals; BLK = Blocks; PTS = Points; AVG = Average

Playoffs
Won WNBA Western Conference Semifinals (2-0) over Minnesota Lynx 
Won WNBA Western Conference Finals (2-1) over Sacramento Monarchs 
Won WNBA Finals (2-1) over Connecticut Sun

Awards and honors
Betty Lennox,  WNBA Finals MVP Award
 Lauren Jackson, WNBA Peak Performer
Lauren Jackson, Best WNBA Player ESPY Award

References

External links
Storm on Basketball Reference
 

Seattle Storm seasons
Seattle
2004 in sports in Washington (state)
Women's National Basketball Association championship seasons
Western Conference (WNBA) championship seasons